Khub Yaran-e Sofla (also Romanized as Khūb Yārān-e Soflá; also known as Khūb Yārān-e Pā’īn and Qanbar) is a village in Jalalvand Rural District, Firuzabad District, Kermanshah County, Kermanshah Province, Iran. At the 2006 census, its population was 96, in 18 families.

References 

Populated places in Kermanshah County